Sainte-Luce is a town and commune in the French overseas department of Martinique.
It contains the village of Trois-Rivières.

Population

See also
Communes of the Martinique department

References

External links

Communes of Martinique
Populated places in Martinique